Hrastje is a settlement east of Dobrina in the Municipality of Šentjur, in eastern Slovenia. The settlement, and the municipality, are included in the Savinja Statistical Region, which is in the Slovenian portion of the historical Duchy of Styria.

Name
The name Hrastje is derived from the Slovene common noun hrast 'oak', referring to the local vegetation.

References

External links
Hrastje at Geopedia

Populated places in the Municipality of Šentjur